Jin Long (born 23 October 1983) is a former Chinese  professional cyclist.

In 2009, he became the first Chinese cyclist to compete in Paris–Roubaix, though he did not finish the race.

References

External links

1983 births
Living people
Chinese male cyclists
21st-century Chinese people